The Screen Savers is an American TV show that aired on TechTV from 1998 to 2005.  The show launched concurrently with the channel ZDTV (later known as TechTV) on May 11, 1998. The Screen Savers originally centered on computers, new technologies, and their adaptations in the world. However, after it was taken over by G4, the show became more general-interest oriented and focused somewhat less on technology. The final episode of The Screen Savers aired on March 18, 2005. Repeat episodes continued to air until March 25, 2005 when its replacement program Attack of the Show! began 3 days later on March 28, 2005. Two spiritual successors to The Screen Savers, This Week in Tech on the TWiT Network with Leo Laporte and Tekzilla on Revision3 with Patrick Norton, were started after the original show concluded. On April 19, 2015, Leo Laporte announced The New Screen Savers, which began airing on TWiT network May 2, 2015.

History

1998–2000
The Screen Savers premiered on May 11, 1998 as part of ZDTV. It aired live from San Francisco, California. Originally hosted by Leo Laporte and Kate Botello, the show featured a large and continually changing group of contributors.

2000–2001
In April 2000, Kate Botello left the show. Patrick Norton took her spot, and he and Laporte hosted the show for much of its run. A few months after Botello left, ZDTV became TechTV.

For much of its run, The Screen Savers had a running time of 60 minutes. This was later changed to 90 minutes (the expansion coming with the advent of the 'TechLive' all-day news format in 2001), but was reduced back to its original length due to scheduling conflicts and the difficulty of creating enough content for a 90-minute program.

2002–2003
In 2002, the show built a new set and designed a new logo and graphics. The new set was much larger and brighter than the previous "basement" set. The new set offered more room for the studio audience, application-specific areas, a dedicated LAN Party section, and a new lab for Yoshi. On December 17, 2002, the show celebrated its 1,000th episode.

2004–2005
2004 was a watershed year for The Screen Savers. Laporte left The Screen Savers to focus on hosting Call for Help, and Kevin Rose took his spot. Soon after Comcast bought TechTV in order to merge it with their struggling gaming channel G4, the TechTV offices were hit with massive layoffs affecting over 200 personnel. G4 moved the show to their studios in Los Angeles, California. The first Los Angeles based episode aired on September 7, 2004. Norton declined to move with the show, opting to remain in San Francisco with his new wife. Alex Albrecht took his spot. On November 11, 2004, Kevin Rose, Sarah Lane, and Alex Albrecht announced on their personal blogs that G4 had decided to revamp The Screen Savers by making it more pop culture, Internet, and gaming-oriented. Alex Albrecht, Yoshi DeHerrera, Dan Huard, executive producer Paul Block and the show's entire staff (mostly TechTV employees) either resigned, made separation deals with G4, or were officially terminated. After the layoffs, the show changed formats, leaving computer and technology-focused content and adopting a gaming and entertainment variety show style that presented gaming and technology related news, product demonstrations, software clinics, interviews with notable people, live music, and such original segments as Dark Deals, Gems of the Internet, and It Came from eBay.

In 2004, Dan Huard, who had just been terminated from the show, admitted that many of the live calls on the show, since moving down to L.A. to be with G4, were staged.

New episodes of the revamped show, which would later become Attack of the Show!, began on November 29, 2004; without a live studio audience. Kevin Pereira and Chi-Lan Lieu took over hosting duties. Chi-Lan later left G4 and was replaced as co-host briefly by Sarah Lane and finally by Kevin Rose. The final hosts of The Screen Savers were Kevin Rose and Kevin Pereira. The show's executive producer was Jim Downs.

Cancellation
On March 17, 2005, the cast announced that on March 25, 2005, The Screen Savers would officially end. The first episode of the officially titled Attack of the Show! aired on March 28, 2005.

Revival 
In April 2015, Leo Laporte announced his version of The Screen Savers, under a slightly different name in 'The New Screen Savers' and lasted through the end of 2018. The show, recorded at 3PM Pacific time on Saturday afternoons, has been made available as an audio and video netcast. Unlike the TechTV version of the show, this revamp featured Laporte alongside a rotating series of co-hosts, some of whom had a history with the show, such as Kate Botello, Patrick Norton, Megan Morrone and Kevin Rose. Other co-hosts were employees of the TWiT network but had no past connection to the show, such as Mike Elgan, Jason Howell, Father Robert Ballecer SJ and Bryan Burnett. The final live show was on December 22, 2018 followed by a pre-recorded "Best of 2018" episode on December 29, 2018.

Format
Each show began with a short commentary on the day's technology-related news stories, sometimes accompanied by an online poll. This was followed by a call for help from a viewer, either through telephone or netcam. Early in the show's run, this was followed by Leo's Boot Camp, designed to help people who were new to computers. More calls were answered throughout the show, along with a variety of segments. These included various interviews, coverage of special events, The Twisted List, Site of the Night, and Download of the Day. As each show came to an end, questions sent in by email were answered. For part of the show's run, quotations sent in from viewers were read at this time.

Segments
Here are a few of the many segments which appeared on The Screen Savers:

 "Bit Chat"
 "Dark Deals"
 "Dark Tips"
 "Download of the Day"
 "Live Calls"
 "Photoshop Challenge"
 "Show and Tell"
 "Site of the Nite"
 "Talkback"
 "The Giz Wiz"
 "The Screen Savers LAN Party"
 "Twisted List"
 "Windows Tips"
 "Windows Tweaks"
 "Yoshi's Mods"
 "Mac Minute"
 "Geek Library"

Hosts

Final hosts
Some of the final hosts of The Screen Savers were:
 Sarah Lane (2004–2005): Sarah became co-host when Chi-Lan Lieu decided to lessen her involvement with the show. She, Kevin Rose, and Brendan Moran were the only on-air talent from TechTV still featured on the show. She left G4 and Attack of the Show! on April 6, 2006.  Sarah currently works at TechCrunch.
 Brendan Moran (2005): Brendan left, along with Sarah, on April 6, 2006.
 Kevin Pereira (2004–2005): Kevin left as host of Attack of the Show on May 30, 2012 and left G4 after G4's coverage of E3 of that year.  He later hosted the game show Let's Ask America. He later returned as a host of Attack of the Show for the network's 2021 revival.
 Kevin Rose (2003–2005): Kevin continued to be a co-host until The Screen Savers ended in March 2005. He co-hosted Attack of the Show!, the replacement for The Screen Savers, until May 2005. Currently works for TrueVentures. He has been part of several online IPTV tech projects along with former TechTV employees, such as Revision3. Kevin is also founder and was chief architect and later CEO of the social news site Digg.

Previous hosts and supporting members
Former hosts and supporting members included:
Alex Albrecht (2004): Alex joined The Screen Savers as co-host on the first G4techTV episode airing from Los Angeles. He was terminated on November 11, 2004. His last episode aired November 10, 2004. Alex cohosted the vidcast Diggnation and The Totally Rad Show, both distributed through Revision3 as well as Project Lore.
Kate Botello (1998–2000): Kate left the show to co-host Extended Play with Adam Sessler. She also co-hosted a TechTV video on computer basics with Chris Pirillo. Kate currently lives in Traverse City, Michigan, where she now contributes to Interlochen, Michigan-based Interlochen Public Radio;  she is on the air from 7 – 10 AM (Eastern) weekdays and is the host of "Show Tunes with Kate Botello", which is heard Sundays at 7 PM Eastern.
Jessica Corbin: Jessica left the show after the merger hosted Love's a Trip, a reality TV show on Style as well as cohosted most of the 26 episodes of InDigital a vidcast production of Revision3.  For short periods she also hosted Tekzilla, The Digg Reel and PopSiren also on Revision3.
Yoshi DeHerrera: Yoshi was the show's modding guru. He was terminated on November 11, 2004. His last episode aired November 10, 2004.
Dan Huard: Dan was terminated on November 11, 2004. His last episode aired November 10, 2004. He has hosted the on-hiatus thebroken vidcast with Revision3 and works full-time at Digg.
Leo Laporte (1998–2004): Leo left the show on April 1, 2004. He was the host of The Lab with Leo Laporte on G4techTV Canada in Canada and How To Channel in Australia, until the series was cancelled in Canada, and pulled from the schedule in Australia. He also has his own technology talk radio show on Premiere Radio Networks (previously exclusive to KFI AM 640), as well as being the host of numerous podcasts, most notably This Week in Tech, which became the basis of TWiT.tv as an independent podcast and video network.
Chi-Lan Lieu (2004–2005): Chi-Lan co-hosted The Screen Savers with Kevin Pereira for a short time in December 2004. She was replaced as co-host by Sarah Lane in January 2005 and has since announced her departure from G4 on her personal blog.
Megan Morrone: Megan left the show to have a baby. She then worked at TWiT.tv from 2006 to 2019. After TWiT she worked for Medium until 2021 when she announced she would be joining Protocol, a news website owned by Capitol News Company.
Patrick Norton (2000–2004): Patrick joined the show as Kate left in 2000. Patrick left the show after the merger of Tech TV and G4 so as to not be transferred to Los Angeles, as he had recently married. He hosted an internet tech show called DL.TV, which he left as of August 2, 2007 to join Revision3.  He is currently the co-host of a viewer supported technology podcast called Tekthing with Shannon Morse.
Martin Sargent: Martin left the show to host his own late night variety show on TechTV: Unscrewed with Martin Sargent. His last episode on The Screen Savers was May 23, 2003, with the exception of making a few appearances on the show in 2004. Unscrewed with Martin Sargent was cancelled on November 11, 2004 and Sargent was terminated shortly after. He then moved onto Revision3 where he produced, Webdrifter, Infected and Internet Superstar. He was laid off as part of cut backs at Revision3 in 2008, and currently works in the advertising industry; he performed a voiceover role for a 2011 Chevrolet Camaro ad during Super Bowl XLV.
Cat Schwartz: Cat left the show to co-host Call for Help and eventually left G4techTV in August 2004.
Morgan Webb: Morgan left the show in April 2003 to co-host X-Play with Adam Sessler. From 2007–2009 she also hosted and produced a tech news vidcast called Webbalert.
Scott Herriott: Scott appeared in the House Call'''s segment and demonstrated technology in his search for Bigfoot.
Wil Wheaton

See also
 This Week in Tech – A weekly podcast hosted by Leo Laporte and other former cast members of The Screen Savers''.
 Revision3 – an IPTV company founded by Kevin Rose and Dan Huard with shows hosted by Rose, Albrecht, Sargent, Norton, Lane, and Corbin
 The New Screen Savers – A revival of The Screen Savers on TWiT.tv.

References

External links
 
 

Television shows filmed in Los Angeles
American non-fiction television series
G4 (American TV network) original programming
TechTV original programming
1998 American television series debuts
2005 American television series endings
Computer television series